There have been 65 ethnic Indians in the Dewan Rakyat since the establishment of the Parliament of Malaysia. As of 2018, there are 15 representatives, or 6.75% of the body.

There is currently one ethnic Indian woman representative in the Dewan Rakyat, Kasthuriraani Patto. The youngest representative elected in parliament at 22 years of age, Prabakaran Parameswaran is also ethnic Indian.

D.P. Vijandran (BN-MIC) is the sole Malaysian Indian legislator to hold the post of Deputy Speaker of Dewan Rakyat from 18 October 1986 to 23 February 1990.

List of members of Indian origin 
This is a complete list of ethnic Indians who have served as members of the Dewan Rakyat, ordered by seniority. This list includes ethnic Indians who served in the past and who continue to serve in the present.

Number of ethnic Indians in the Dewan Rakyat

References 

Parliament of Malaysia